The Central Atlantic Forest Ecological Corridor ( is an ecological corridor in the states of Espírito Santo and Bahia, Brazil. It promotes improvements to connectivity between fragments of Atlantic Forest in the region with the goal of maintaining genetic health among flora and fauna.

History

The corridor was created as part of the Ecological Corridors Project, for which the final evaluation was completed by the Ministry of the Environment in December 2000.
A grant agreement between the World Bank and the Ministry of the Environment was signed in December 2001.
The project was effective as of March 2002.
Priority was given to the implementation of the Central Amazon Ecological Corridor and the Central Atlantic Forest Ecological Corridor to test different conditions in the two biomes and use the lessons learned to prepare and support creation of other corridors.

In the central corridor the state committees of the Atlantic Forest Biosphere Reserve act as project management committees, with representatives from traditional populations, environmental NGOs, producers and businesses and the three levels of government.
The strategy is to ensure protection of significant forest remnants and gradually increase the amount of connection between core portions of the landscape through control, protection and recovery of forest cover and development of sustainable production activities that contribute to the connections.

Location

As of 2006 the corridor included 83 protected areas.
Of these, state-level units accounted for 53% of the area, 16 federal units covered  and private reserves covered .

This included areas of sea up to the edge of the continental shelf.
About 95% of the corridor was privately owned land, in 163 municipalities.
In Bahia there were 10 federal, 15 state, 7 municipal and 28 private natural heritage reserves.
In Espírito Santo there were 21 federal, 17 state, 17 municipal and 41 private reserves.

There are two centers of endemism.
The region has various types of rainforest including semi-deciduous forest, restingas and mangroves along river estuaries.
The forest has great diversity of woody plant species. 

Conservation units

The lists of protected areas below exclude the many private reserves included in the corridor.

Fully protected units

Fully protected units in the corridor include:

Sustainable use units

Sustainable use units in the corridor include:

Environmental protection areas

Environmental protection areas in the corridor include:

Notes

Sources

Ecological corridors of Brazil
Protected areas of Bahia
Protected areas of Espírito Santo
2002 establishments in Brazil
Protected areas of the Atlantic Forest